Alabama A&M Events Center is the new arena that host the Alabama A&M Bulldogs basketball and volleyball teams of the Southwestern Athletic Conference. The arena is located in Huntsville, Alabama, right on the campus of Alabama A&M University. The facility holds up to 6,000 people for basketball games. Other than basketball and volleyball games, graduation ceremonies, and other functions of Alabama A&M University. It will also contain locker rooms for the team, training rooms, a Hall of Fame honoring past Alabama A&M student athletes, and a kitchen to help provide meals for on-campus events. The construction was completed in 2022.

References

Alabama A&M Bulldogs basketball
College basketball venues in the United States
Sports venues in Huntsville, Alabama
Basketball venues in Alabama
Indoor arenas in Alabama